Denny McCarthy (born March 4, 1993) is an American professional golfer.

Amateur career
McCarthy was born in Takoma Park, Maryland. He played competitively on the junior golf circuit beginning at the age of 10, finding a lot of success on the MAPGA junior tour.  He played varsity golf and basketball at Georgetown Preparatory School. He played college golf at the University of Virginia where he was a two-time All-American.

McCarthy played on the 2010 Junior Ryder Cup team along with Jordan Spieth, Justin Thomas, and Ollie Schniederjans.

While he was a senior at UVA, McCarthy led the United States to victory in the 2014 World Amateur Team Championship (Eisenhower Trophy) along with Beau Hossler and Bryson DeChambeau. He posted a final round 8-under 64 while being the only American to shoot in the 60s all four days. He finished the tournament 5th overall.

In 2015, he was selected to play on the U.S. Walker Cup team where he played team matches with his former Eisenhower Trophy teammate, Beau Hossler. His 2015 Porter Cup win and clutch play to help take home the Eisenhower Trophy earned him a spot on the team.

McCarthy won the Maryland Amateur twice (2013 and 2014) and the Maryland Open three times (2010, 2013, and 2015). 

McCarthy finished tied for 42nd at the 2015 U.S. Open.

Professional career
After playing in the 2015 Walker Cup, McCarthy turned pro and played on the Web.com Tour for the 2016 season. He finished the 2016 season with seven top-25 finishes including two top-10s in 21 events. He finished the year outside the top-25 and would remain on the Web.com Tour for the following season. In 2017, he finished with nine top-25 finishes including four top-10s in 22 events. After finishing outside the top-25 in the regular season, he locked up his PGA Tour card in the Web.com Tour Finals.

Personal life
McCarthy has a brother and two sisters. Brother Ryan played college golf at Loyola University Maryland. Sister Cristina played college lacrosse at James Madison University and Georgetown University and sister Michaela currently plays lacrosse at Virginia Tech.

Amateur wins
2010 Maryland Boys Junior Amateur, Junior PGA Championship
2011 Maryland Boys Junior Amateur
2012 Northern Intercollegiate
2013 Kenridge Invitational, Maryland State Amateur
2014 Jim West Intercollegiate (tie), Maryland State Amateur
2015 Porter Cup

Source:

Professional wins (4)

Web.com Tour wins (1)

Other wins (3)
2010 Maryland Open (as an amateur)
2013 Maryland Open (as an amateur)
2015 Maryland Open (as an amateur)

Results in major championships
Results not in chronological order in 2020.

CUT = missed the half-way cut
"T" indicates a tie for a place
NT = No tournament due to COVID-19 pandemic

Results in The Players Championship

"T" indicates a tie for a place
C = Canceled after the first round due to the COVID-19 pandemic

U.S. national team appearances
Amateur
Junior Ryder Cup: 2010 (winners)
Eisenhower Trophy: 2014 (winners)
Walker Cup: 2015

See also
2017 Web.com Tour Finals graduates
2018 Web.com Tour Finals graduates

References

External links

American male golfers
Virginia Cavaliers men's golfers
PGA Tour golfers
Korn Ferry Tour graduates
Golfers from Maryland
People from Takoma Park, Maryland
1993 births
Living people